Micah is a given name.

Micah is the  name of several people in the Hebrew Bible (Old Testament), and means "Who is like God?" The name is sometimes found with theophoric extensions. Suffix theophory in Yah and in Yahweh results in Michaiah or Michaihu, meaning who is like Yahweh? Suffix theophory in El results in Michael, meaning "who is like god".

The name is not as common as Michael or Michiel.

Bible
Micah son of Mephibosheth son of Jonathan son of Saul, the first king of Israel
Micah (prophet), eponymous prophet of the Book of Micah in the Old Testament
Micaiah, a prophet and the son of Imlah, who gave a negative prophecy to Ahab on his request

Notable people with the given name "Micah" include

A
Micah Abernathy (born 1997), American football player
Micah Aivazoff (born 1969), Canadian ice hockey player
Micah Albert (born 1979), American photojournalist
Micah Alberti (born 1984), American actor
Micah Altman (born 1967), American social scientist
Micah Armstrong, American evangelist
Micah Lakin Avni (born 1969), Israeli businessman
Micah Awe (born 1994), Nigerian Canadian football player

B
Micah Balfour (born 1978), English actor
Micah Ballard (born 1975), American poet
Micah Barlow (1873–1936), English cricketer
Micah Barnes (born 1960), Canadian singer-songwriter
Micah Blunt, American basketball player
Micah Bowie (born 1974), American baseball player
Micah Boyd (born 1982), American rower 
Micah Brooks (1775–1857), American politician
Micah Brown (born 1986), Canadian football player

C
Micah Caskey (born 1981), American politician
Micah Cheserem, Kenyan banker
Micah Christenson (born 1993), American volleyball player
Micah Cooks (born 1981), American soccer player

D
Micah Downs (born 1986), American basketball player
Micah Daigneault (born 1997), American middle-distance runner

E
Micah Evans (born 1993), English footballer

F
Micah Fitzerman-Blue, American screenwriter
Micah Fowler (born 1998), American actor
Micah Franklin (disambiguation), multiple people

G
Micah Garen (born 1968), American filmmaker
Micah Gravley (born 1974), American politician
Micah Gunnell (born 1980), American comic book artist

H
Micah Hannemann (born 1994), American football player
Micah Hart (born 1997), Canadian ice hockey player
Micah Hauptman (born 1973), American actor
Micah Hawkins (1777–1825), American poet
Micah Hilton (born 1985), Montserratian footballer
Micah P. Hinson (born 1981), American musician
Micah Hoffpauir (born 1980), American baseball player
Micah Hyde (disambiguation), multiple people

J
Micah Jenkins (1835–1864), American general
Micah Jesse (born 1986), American blogger
Micah Johnson (disambiguation), multiple people

K
Micha Kaufman (born 1946), Israeli sport shooter
Micah Kellner (born 1979), American politician
Micah Kiser (born 1995), American football player
Micah Knorr (born 1975), American football player
Micah Kogo (born 1986), Kenyan long-distance runner

L
Micah Lancaster (born 1984), American basketball player
Micah Lawrence (born 1990), American swimmer
Micah Lea'alafa (born 1991), Solomon Islands footballer
Micah Joseph Lebensohn (1828–1852), Russian poet
Micah Lewensohn (1952–2017), Israeli theater director
Micah Lexier (born 1960), Canadian artist
Micah Kai Lynette (born 2001), Thai figure skater

M
Micah Maʻa (born 1997), American volleyball player
Micha Marah (born 1953), Belgian singer and actress
Micah Masei (born 1999), Samoan swimmer
Micah Massey (born 1987), American musician
Micah McFadden (born 2000), American football player
Micah McLaurin (born 1994), American pianist

N
Micah Naftalin (1933–2009), American activist
Micah Nathan, American novelist
Micah Neal (born 1974), American politician

O
Micah Obiero (born 2001), English footballer
Micah Ohlman (born 1972), American journalist
Micah Ortega (born 1976), American guitarist
Micah Owings (born 1982), American baseball player

P
Micah Parsons (born 1999), American football player
Micah Paulino (born 1992), Guamanian footballer
Micah Pellerin (born 1988), American football player
Micah Perks (born 1963), American writer
Micah Potter (born 1998), American basketball player

R
Micah Richards (born 1988), English football player
Micah Ross (born 1976), American football player
Micah Rucker (born 1985), American football player

S
Micah Salt (1847–1915), English tailor
Micah C. Saufley (1842–1910), American judge
Micah Schwartzman (born 1976), American law professor
Micah Shrewsberry (born 1976), American basketball coach
Micah Sloat (born 1981), American actor
Micah Smaldone (born 1978), American musician
Micah Solusod (born 1990), American voice actor
Micah Stampley (born 1971), American singer-songwriter
Micah Sterling (1784–1844), American politician

T
Micah Taul (1785–1850), American politician
Micah Taul (Alabama politician) (1832–1873), American politician
Micah Teitz (born 1996), Canadian football player
Micah Townshend (1749–1832), American political leader
Micah True (1953–2012), American runner
Micah Tyler (born 1983), American singer

W
Micha Wertheim (born 1972), Dutch comedian
Micah M. White (born 1982), American activist
Micah Wilkinson (born 1996), New Zealand sailor
Micah Williams (disambiguation), multiple people
Micah Wright (born 1974), American author

Z
Micah Zenko, American political scientist

Fictional characters
Micah Clarke, a character in the novel Micah Clarke
Micah Rains, a character in the comic series Wonder Woman
Micah Sanders, a character in the television series Heroes
Micah Bell lll, the main antagonist of the video game Red Dead Redemption 2
King Micah, a character in the television series She-Ra: Princess of Power

Surname
Ben Micah (??–2022), Papua New Guinean politician
Duke Micah (born 1991), Ghanaian boxer
Teagan Micah (born 1997), Australian footballer

See also
Michael (disambiguation), a disambiguation page for "Michael"
Micah (disambiguation), a disambiguation page for "Micah"
Myka (disambiguation), a disambiguation page for "Myka"

References

Sources

Unisex given names
Hebrew masculine given names
Hebrew feminine given names
English masculine given names
English feminine given names